India's remote sensing program was developed with the idea of applying space technologies for the benefit of humankind and the development of the country. The program involved the development of three principal capabilities. The first was to design, build and launch satellites to a Sun-synchronous orbit. The second was to establish and operate ground stations for spacecraft control, data transfer along with data processing and archival. The third was to use the data obtained for various applications on the ground.

India demonstrated the ability of remote sensing for societal application by detecting coconut root-wilt disease from a helicopter mounted multispectral camera in 1970. This was followed by flying two experimental satellites, Bhaskara-1 in 1979 and Bhaskara-2 in 1981. These satellites carried optical and microwave payloads.

India's remote sensing programme under the Indian Space Research Organization (ISRO) started off in 1988 with the IRS-1A, the first of the series of indigenous state-of-art operating remote sensing satellites, which was successfully launched into a polar Sun-synchronous orbit on March 17, 1988, from the Soviet Cosmodrome at Baikonur.

These tools quickly enabled India to map, monitor and manage its natural resources at various spatial resolutions. The operational availability of data products to the user organisations further strengthened the relevance of remote sensing applications and management in the country.

IRS System

Following the successful demonstration flights of Bhaskara-1 and Bhaskara-2 satellites launched in 1979 and 1981, respectively, India began to develop the indigenous Indian Remote Sensing (IRS) satellite program to support the national economy in the areas of agriculture, water resources, forestry and ecology, geology, water sheds, marine fisheries and coastal management.

Towards this end, India had established the National Natural Resources Management System (NNRMS) for which the Department of Space (DOS) is the nodal agency, providing operational remote sensing data services. Data from the IRS satellites is received and disseminated by several countries all over the world. With the advent of high-resolution satellites, new applications in the areas of urban sprawl, infrastructure planning and other large scale applications for mapping have been initiated.

The IRS system is the largest constellation of remote sensing satellites for civilian use in operation today in the world, with 11 operational satellites. All these are placed in polar Sun-synchronous orbit and provide data in a variety of spatial, spectral and temporal resolutions. Indian Remote Sensing Programme completed its 25 years of successful operations on March 17, 2013.

IRS data applications 

Data from Indian Remote Sensing satellites are used for various applications of resources survey and management under the National Natural Resources Management System (NNRMS). Following is the list of those applications:

 Space Based Inputs for Decentralized Planning (SIS-DP)
 National Urban Information System (NUIS)
 ISRO Disaster Management Support Programme (ISRO-DMSP)
 Biodiversity characterizations at landscape level - http://bis.iirs.gov.in
 Preharvest crop area and production estimation of major crops.
 Drought monitoring and assessment based on vegetation condition.
 Flood risk zone mapping and flood damage assessment.
 Hydro-geomorphological maps for locating underground water resources for drilling well.
 Irrigation command area status monitoring
 Snow-melt run-off estimates for planning water use in down stream projects
 Land use and land cover mapping
 Urban planning
 Forest survey
 Wetland mapping
 Environmental impact analysis
 Mineral prospecting
 Coastal studies
 Integrated Mission for Sustainable Development (initiated in 1992) for generating locale-specific prescriptions for integrated land and water resources development in 174 districts.
 North Eastern District Resources Plan (NEDRP)

IRS launch log

The initial versions are composed of the 1 (A,B,C,D). The later versions are named based on their area of application, including OceanSat, CartoSat, ResourceSat. Some of the satellites have alternate designations based on the launch number and vehicle (P series for PSLV). From 2020, the naming criteria was returned to the generic EOS, which stands for Earth Observation Satellite.

IRS Data Availability 
Data from IRS is available to its users through NRSC Data Centre and also through Bhuvan Geoportal of ISRO. NRSC data center provides data through its purchase process, while Bhuvan Geoportal provides data in free and open domain.

Capacity Building for IRS and Other Remote Sensing Data 
The capacity building programme of ISRO for IRS and other remote sensing applications is through Indian Institute of Remote Sensing (IIRS) Dehradun and UN affiliated Center of Space Science and Technology Education in Asia and the Pacific (CSSTEAP) Center located at Dehradun of Uttrakhand State in India.

Future IRS launches 

The following are the remote sensing satellites planned by ISRO to be launched next, strengthening the fleet of IRS satellites and widening their applications:

Oceansat-3/EOS-6: Oceansat-3 would carry Thermal IR Sensor, 12 channel Ocean Color Monitors, Scatterometer and Passive Microwave Radiometer. IR Sensor and Ocean Color Monitor would be used in the analysis for operational Potential Fishing Zones. Satellite is mainly for ocean biology and sea state applications. It has been re-designated as EOS-06 and is slated for launch on board the PSLV-C53 in August–September 2022.
EOS-2/Microsat will fly on board the maiden flight of the new Small Satellite Launch Vehicle (SSLV). The flight is expected in May 2022. The satellite is built around the MicroSat TD bus. It will be built for cartographic applications, land use mapping, and utilities and development mapping.
GISATs: GISAT-2 is planned for launch in 2022–23. They are expected to provide images from geostationary orbit during disasters.

References

Earth observation satellites of India
Remote sensing programs
1988 establishments in India